Jamie Lindemann Nelson is a philosophy professor and bioethicist currently teaching at Michigan State University. Nelson earned her doctorate in philosophy at the State University of New York at Buffalo in 1980 and taught at the University of Tennessee at Knoxville and St. John's University before moving to Michigan State University. In addition, Nelson was an Associate for Ethical Studies at The Hastings Center from 1990–95 and is both a Woodrow Wilson Visiting Fellow and a Fellow of the Hastings Center. Nelson usually teaches courses on biomedical ethics, ethical theory, moral psychology, feminist theory, and philosophy of language.

Contributions to philosophy
Nelson's work primarily focuses on biomedical ethics, ethical theory, moral psychology, feminist theory, applied philosophy, and philosophy of language. In addition to numerous publications, Nelson edited both Rationing Sanity: Ethical Issues in Managed Mental Health Care and Meaning and Medicine: A Reader in the Philosophy of Health Care with Hilde Lindemann Nelson. In addition, Nelson is the editor for the Rowman and Littlefield series entitled Explorations in Bioethics and the Medical Humanities, the co-editor, with Hilde Lindemann Nelson, for the Reflective Bioethics series published by Routledge, and the editor of the Journal of Clinical Ethics Special Section on Families and Bioethics.

Professional publications
Nelson has published numerous peer-reviewed articles in journals such as The Journal of Bioethical Inquiry, Metaphilosophy, The Kennedy Institute of Ethics Journal, Journal of Clinical Ethics, Theoretical Medicine and Bioethics, The Hastings Center Report, and The Journal of Medicine and Philosophy.

Her books include Hippocrates’ Maze: Ethical Explorations of the Medical Labyrinth, Alzheimer's: Answers to Hard Questions for Families, and The Patient in the Family. In addition, as remarked above, Nelson has also edited five collections including Rationing Sanity: Ethical Issues in Managed Mental Health Care, Meaning and Medicine: A Reader in the Philosophy of Health Care and the book series Explorations in Bioethics and the Medical Humanities.

Awards and distinctions
In addition to being named a Hastings Center Fellow and a Woodrow Wilson Visiting Fellow, Nelson also received a National Endowment for the Humanities grant to conduct a Summer Seminar for College and University Teachers entitled “Bioethics in Particular.” In addition, Nelson won an Outstanding Faculty Award from the Department of Philosophy at The University of Tennessee and the Senior Research and Creative Achievement Award from the College of Arts and Sciences. She was also awarded a Greenwall Foundation Grant for a research project on ethical issues in family caregiving for people suffering from progressive dementias and a Joint National Science Foundation/National Institutes of Health Grant for a research program on ethical issues in “exemplary” medical research.”

Selected works

Books

Chapters in books

See also
American Philosophy
American Philosophers

References

External links
 Facullty webpage
 Curriculum vitae

Year of birth missing (living people)
Living people
American philosophers
Michigan State University faculty
Bioethicists
Hastings Center Fellows
University at Buffalo alumni